Willie Michael Toweel (6 April 1934 – 25 December 2017) was a boxer from South Africa, who won the bronze medal in the flyweight division (– 51 kg) at the 1952 Summer Olympics in Helsinki, FInland.

Personal life
Willie was born in Benoni, and was the brother of Alan, Jimmy, Fraser, Vic, Maurice, Maureen Toweel and Antoinette Moussallem; and the uncle of Paul Toweel.

Amateur career
As an amateur, Willie won Junior and Senior South African boxing titles, and won the bronze medal at the 1952 Olympic Games.  He lost to Nate Brooks of the United States, the eventual gold medalist.

1952 Olympic results
Below are the results of Willie Toweel, a South African boxer who competed in the flyweight division at the 1952 Helsinki Olympics.

 Round of 32: defeated Kornel Molnar (Hungary) by decision, 3–0.
 Round of 16: defeated Al Asuncion (Philippines) by decision, 2-1
 Quarterfinal: defeated Han Soo-An (South Korea) by decision, 3–0.
 Semifinal: lost to Nate Brooks (United States) by decision, 0–3.  (was awarded a bronze medal)

Professional career
He began his professional career in 1953. After notching up a few wins, Willie fought Matthew Raaff for the vacant South African Bantamweight title at Feather Market Hall in Port Elizabeth, and knocked Raaff out in the seventh round. On 22 May 1954, Toweel outpointed Tony Lombard over 12 rounds to win the vacant South African Featherweight Title.

Winning his next ten fights, Willie challenged Robert Cohen for the World Bantamweight title. They fought on 3 September 1955, at Rand Stadium in Johannesburg. Toweel was knocked down three times in the second round, twice for three counts, and once for no count. Toweel fought back courageously, and was also knocked down in the tenth round. The hard-fought world title bout resulted in a 15-round draw, with Cohen retaining his world title.

Moving up a division to Lightweight, Toweel faced rival Johnny 'Smiler' Van Rensburg for the British Empire and South African Lightweight Titles. In their first encounter, Toweel lost, retiring in the ninth round with hand and ankle injuries. Over the span of their careers, they would fight each other another five times, Willie winning the next three bouts with Van Rensburg, and their final bout wit each other ending in a draw over 15 rounds.

Willie was affected by tragedy when he fought 21-year-old South African Hubert Essakow on 19 March 1956, in defense of his South African Featherweight Title. Essakow sustained fatal brain injuries in the fight, and died 52 hours later after losing to Toweel by 11th-round knockout. Willie, being a religious man, seriously considered retirement from boxing. He often held back his attack on many of his future opponents, in fear he might hurt them. Late in his career, in the same venue where he fought Essakow, he was disqualified in a bout against Jannie Botes for a low blow. Afterwards, he said during the fight his memories of Essakow came flooding back, and he just wanted to find an excuse to get out of the ring.

With his management team behind him, Toweel continued to box, and racked up another seven wins, with a draw against Van Rensburg. Willie then fought in England, and defeated Dave Charnley on points over 15 rounds to defend his British Empire Lightweight Title. Toweel won his next eight fights before losing to Frenchman Guy Gracia by TKO in the seventh round on 23 April 1958, in Kelvin Hall, Glasgow. Willie had unfortunately been suffering with bad sinusitis before the fight. Willie got revenge 10 months later, defeating Gracia on points in Cape Town, South Africa.

After defeating Van Rensburg for the final time in Salisbury, Toweel faced Dave Charnley again. Struggling to the Lightweight weight limit, Toweel lost his British Empire Lightweight title by getting knocked out in the tenth round.

Moving up to welterweight, Toweel fought Len Matthews at Madison Square Garden on 20 November 1959. He was the first South African to top the bill there. Despite being knocked down twice in the eighth round, Willie fought brilliantly and won on points. Willie was beaten on points for the first time, losing a 10-round decision to Wally Swift in Nottingham on 7 December 1959.

Following the Swift fight, Willie gained two more wins in South Africa, over Julio Silvo and Fred Tiedt before beating Benny Niewenhuizen for the vacant South African Welterweight title, to win his fourth national title. On 17 September 1960, Toweel was disqualified against Jannie Botes, and lost his title. In his last professional ring appearance, Toweel fought future World Welterweight and Middleweight champion Emile Griffith at Madison Square Garden on 22 October 1960. Willie started well in the bout, but was stopped in the eighth round. This was his last fight. Toweel retired from boxing at age 26, with a career record of 46 wins, six losses and two draws, with 23 knockouts.

|-
| style="text-align:center;" colspan="8"|45 Wins (23 knockouts, 22 decisions), 6 Losses (3 knockouts, 3 decision), 2 Draws
|-  style="text-align:center; background:#e3e3e3;"
|  style="border-style:none none solid solid; "|Result
|  style="border-style:none none solid solid; "|Record
|  style="border-style:none none solid solid; "|Opponent
| style="border-style:none none solid solid; "|Type
| style="border-style:none none solid solid; "|Rounds
| style="border-style:none none solid solid; "|Date
| style="border-style:none none solid solid; "|Location
| style="border-style:none none solid solid; "|Notes
|align=left|
|- align=center
|Lost
|45–6
|align=left| Emile Griffith
|TKO
|10
|22 October September 1960
|align=left|
|align=left|
|- align=center
|Lost
|45–5
|align=left| Jannie Botes
|DQ
|12
|17 September 1960
|align=left|
|align=left|
|- align=center
|Win
|45–3
|align=left| Benny Nieuwenhuizen
|PTS
|12
|27 August 1960
|align=left|
|align=left|
|- align=center
|Win
|44–3
|align=left| Fred Tiedt
|PTS
|10
|16 July 1960
|align=left|
|align=left|
|- align=center
|Win
|43–3
|align=left| Julio Silvo
|KO
|10
|16 April 1960
|align=left|
|align=left|
|- align=center
|Lost
|42–4
|align=left| Wally Swift
|PTS
|10
|7 December 1959
|align=left|
|align=left|
|- align=center
|Win
|42–3
|align=left| Len Matthews
|SD
|10
|20 November 1959
|align=left|
|align=left|
|- align=center
|Win
|41–3
|align=left| Paddy Graham
|TKO
|10
|3 October 1959
|align=left|
|align=left|
|- align=center
|Lost
|40–3
|align=left| Dave Charnley
|KO
|15
|12 May 1959
|align=left|
|align=left|
|- align=center
|Win
|40–2
|align=left| Johnny van Rensburg
|PTS
|10
|21 March 1959
|align=left|
|align=left|
|- align=center
|Win
|39–2
|align=left| Guy Gracia
|KO
|10
|24 February 1959
|align=left|
|align=left|
|- align=center
|Win
|38–2
|align=left|Tony Garcia
|KO
|10
|19 November 1958
|align=left|
|align=left|
|- align=center
|Lost
|37–2
|align=left| Guy Gracia
|TKO
|10
|23 April 1958
|align=left|
|align=left|
|- align=center
|Win
|37–1
|align=left| Fernand Nollet
|PTS
|10
|25 March 1958
|align=left|
|align=left|
|- align=center
|Win
|36–1
|align=left| Orlando Zulueta
|PTS
|10
|1 January 1958
|align=left|
|align=left|
|- align=center
|Win
|35–1
|align=left| Al Nevarez
|PTS
|10
|30 November 1957
|align=left| 
|align=left|
|- align=center
|Win
|34–1
|align=left| Jose Hernandez
|TKO
|10
|5 November 1957
|align=left|
|align=left|
|- align=center
|Win
|33–1
|align=left| Jimmy Carter
|PTS
|10
|8 October 1957
|align=left|
|align=left|
|- align=center
|Win
|32–1
|align=left| Boby Ros
|PTS
|10
|6 September 1957
|align=left|
|align=left|
|- align=center
|Win
|31–1
|align=left| Billy Spider Kelly
|PTS
|10
|15 August 1957
|align=left|
|align=left|
|- align=center
|Win
|30–1
|align=left| Dave Charnley
|PTS
|15
|11 May 1957
|align=left|
|align=left|
|- align=center
|Win
|29–1
|align=left| Franco Rosini
|PTS
|10
|11 May 1957
|align=left|
|align=left|
|- align=center
|Win
|28–1
|align=left| Johnny van Rensburg
|RTD
|15
|14 February 1957
|align=left| 
|align=left|
|- align=center
|Win
|27–1
|align=left| Richie Howard
|PTS
|10
|1 December 1956
|align=left| 
|align=left|
|- align=center
|Win
|26–1
|align=left| Richie Howard
|PTS
|15
|10 November 1956
|align=left| 
|align=left|
|- align=center
|Win
|25–1
|align=left| Georges DeVos
|PTS
|10
|6 October 1956
|align=left| 
|align=left|
|- align=center
|style="background:#abcdef;"|Draw
|24–1
|align=left| Johnny van Rensburg
|PTS
|15
|11 August 1956
|align=left| 
|align=left|
|- align=center
|Win
|24–1
|align=left| Johnny van Rensburg
|PTS
|15
|16 June 1956
|align=left| 
|align=left|
|- align=center
|Win
|23–1
|align=left| Tienie Pretorius
 |TKO
|10
|19 March 1956
|align=left| 
|align=left|
|- align=center
|Win
|22–1
|align=left| Hubert Essakow
|KO
|12
|19 March 1956
|align=left| 
|align=left|
|- align=center
|Lost
|21–1
|align=left| Johnny van Rensburg
|RTD
|15
|10 December 1955
|align=left| 
|align=left|
|- align=center
|Win
|21–0
|align=left| Albert Mueller
|KO
|10
|19 November 1955
|align=left| 
|align=left|
|- align=center
|style="background:#abcdef;"|Draw
|20–0
|align=left| Robert Cohen
|PTS
|15
|3 September 1955
|align=left| 
|align=left|
|- align=center
|Win
|20–0
|align=left| Tino Cardinale
|TKO
|10
|23 May 1955
|align=left| 
|align=left|
|- align=center
|Win
|19–0
|align=left| Henry Bruyns
|KO
|12
|23 April 1955
|align=left| 
|align=left|
|- align=center
|Win
|18–0
|align=left| Willie van der Merwe
|KO
|8
|9 April 1955
|align=left| 
|align=left|
|- align=center
|Win
|17–0
|align=left| Jean Bichot
|PTS
|10
|14 March 1955
|align=left| 
|align=left|
|- align=center
|Win
|16–0
|align=left| Louis Klopper
|RTD
|12
|7 February 1955
|align=left| 
|align=left|
|- align=center
|Win
|15–0
|align=left| Jerry Jooste
|TKO
|8
|13 December 1954
|align=left| 
|align=left|
|- align=center
|Win
|14–0
|align=left| Andre Valignat
|PTS
|10
|6 November 1954
|align=left| 
|align=left|
|- align=center
|Win
|13–0
|align=left| Pappy Gault
|PTS
|10
|2 October 1954
|align=left| 
|align=left|
|- align=center
|Win
|12–0
|align=left| Gerry Britz
|TKO
|10
|2 September 1954
|align=left| 
|align=left|
|- align=center
|Win
|11–0
|align=left| Denny Dawson
|KO
|10
|30 June 1954
|align=left| 
|align=left|
|- align=center
|Win
|10–0
|align=left| Tony Lombard
|PTS
|12
|22 May 1954
|align=left| 
|align=left|
|- align=center
|Win
|9–0
|align=left| Gary Gordon
|TKO
|8
|8 May 1954
|align=left| 
|align=left|
|- align=center
|Win
|8–0
|align=left| Jackie O'Connor
|KO
|12
|9 March 1954
|align=left| 
|align=left|
|- align=center
|Win
|7–0
|align=left| Matthew Raaff
|TKO
|12
|26 October 1953
|align=left| 
|align=left|
|- align=center
|Win
|6–0
|align=left| Jerry Jooste
|RTD
|8
|3 October 1953
|align=left| 
|align=left|
|- align=center
|Win
|5–0
|align=left| Kalla Persson
|KO
|6
|29 August 1953
|align=left| 
|align=left|
|- align=center
|Win
|4–0
|align=left| Bokkie Grobbler
|KO
|6
|5 August 1953
|align=left| 
|align=left|
|- align=center
|Win
|3–0
|align=left| Billy Lamberton
|PTS
|6
|24 July 1953
|align=left| 
|align=left|
|- align=center
|Win
|2–0
|align=left| Tiny Corbett
|KO
|8
|13 June 1953
|align=left| 
|align=left|
|- align=center
|Win
|1–0
|align=left| Jackie O'Connor
|PTS
|4
|5 September 1953
|align=left| 
|align=left|

Training career
Toweel trained Charlie Weir, and world champions Brian Mitchell and Thulani Malinga.

Olympic results
Defeated Kornél Molnár (Hungary) 3-0
Defeated Al Asuncion (Philippines) 2-1
Defeated Han Soo-An (South Korea) 3-0
Lost to Nate Brooks (United States) 0-3

Later life and death
Willie lived in Randburg, South Africa, until his death on Christmas Day, 25 December 2017.

References

External links
 databaseOlympics
sportspotter.com

1934 births
2017 deaths
People from Benoni
Flyweight boxers
Boxers at the 1952 Summer Olympics
Olympic boxers of South Africa
Olympic bronze medalists for South Africa
Olympic medalists in boxing
Medalists at the 1952 Summer Olympics
South African people of Lebanese descent
Sportspeople of Lebanese descent
South African male boxers
Sportspeople from Gauteng